Felimida sphoni is a species of colorful sea slug, a dorid nudibranch, a marine gastropod mollusk in the family Chromodorididae.

Description
The body reaches a length of 35 mm.

Distribution
This species occurs in the Pacific Ocean off the Galapagos Islands and in the Gulf of California, Western Mexico

References

 Rudman W.B. (1984) The Chromodorididae (Opisthobranchia: Mollusca) of the Indo-West Pacific: a review of the genera. Zoological Journal of the Linnean Society 81 (2/3): 115-273. page(s): 130
 Debelius, H. & Kuiter, R.H. (2007) Nudibranchs of the world. ConchBooks, Frankfurt, 360 pp.  page(s): 179
 Behrens D.W., Gosliner T.M. & Hermosillo A. (2009) A new species of dorid nudibranch (Mollusca) from the Revillagigedo Islands of the Mexican Pacific. Proceedings of the California Academy of Sciences ser. 4, 60(11): 423-429.

Chromodorididae
Gastropods described in 1971
Taxa named by Eveline Du Bois-Reymond Marcus